Antonio Ereditato (Napoli, 2 June 1955) is an Italian physicist, currently associate researcher at Fermilab, Batavia, USA, and Emeritus professor at the University of Bern, Switzerland, where he has been Director of the Laboratory for High Energy Physics from 2006 to 2020. From 2021 to 2022 he has been Visiting Professor at the Yale University, USA. 
He carried out research activities in the field of experimental neutrino physics, of weak interactions and strong interactions with experiments conducted at CERN, in Japan, at Fermilab in United States and at the LNGS in Italy. Ereditato has accomplished several R&D studies on particle detectors: wire chambers, calorimeters, time projection chambers, nuclear emulsions, detectors for medical applications.

Biography

Ereditato obtained the degree in physics (1981) and the PhD (1987) at the University of Naples Federico II. He worked at CNRS Strasbourg, at CERN and at the Istituto Nazionale di Fisica Nucleare in Napoli, where he obtained the position of Director of Research since 1998. From 2006 to 2020 Ereditato has been Ordinary Professor of Experimental Particle Physics at the University of Bern.

He has served in several international scientific committees: SPSC, CNGS and LHCC at CERN, and is presently member of the PAC of the Joint Institute for Nuclear Research of Dubna. Ereditato has been also member of the Swiss National Science Foundation. He served in Advisory Committees of international conferences, such as the Calorimetry Conference. Referee and peer review member of international journals and of Funding Agencies, Ereditato is currently Editor-in-Chief of Instruments. He is also member of the Aspen Institute Italia and president of SAIS (Association of the Italian Academics in Switzerland).

From 2008 to 2012 Antonio Ereditato has been the spokesperson of the OPERA neutrino experiment that he proposed in 1997 together with Kimio Niwa and Paolo Strolin. The experiment studied neutrino oscillations along the CNGS beam from CERN to the LNGS Gran Sasso Laboratory. On 31 May 2010 Ereditato announced the detection of the first tau-neutrino by OPERA. This was the first indication of the direct appearance of neutrino oscillations. In September 2011 the OPERA Collaboration announced that an anomaly was detected in the measurement of the neutrino velocity, pointing to the possibility of superluminal muon neutrinos, see (mistaken) faster-than-light neutrino anomaly. The source of the anomaly was then found by the OPERA researchers as due to an instrumental problem.

As head of the ATLAS Bern group, Ereditato contributed to the discovery of the Higgs Boson in 2012. In the framework of the T2K experiment in Japan, in 2013 he took part in the discovery of the appearance of neutrino oscillations  and with the OPERA collaboration he shared the discovery of tau-neutrino appearance. For these results Ereditato was one of the recipients of the 2016 Breakthrough Prize in Fundamental Physics. He is currently involved in the USA neutrino program, notably with the MicroBooNE and SBND experiments at Fermilab aimed at the search for sterile neutrinos. He has been one of the founders of the DUNE experiment for the high precision study of neutrino oscillations and astroparticle physics. Ereditato's group is contributing to the realization of the Near Detector of the experiment with the so-called ArgonCube liquid argon time projection chamber.

The research group of Ereditato has also been leader in the R&D for detectors with liquid argon TPCs and for the use of emulsion detectors in various applications, such as those for cosmic muon radiography. Antonio Ereditato has also contributed to setting up a research laboratory in Bern centered on a cyclotron for medical research.

Ereditato is author of more than 1400 scientific publications and of over 40 talks at international conferences. He has supervised more than 70 master and PhD theses.

Antonio Ereditato is very active with scientific divulgation. In particular, he has written for general public: Le Particelle Elementari, Il Saggiatore (2017) — English version, Ever Smaller, MIT Press (2020) — Guida Turistica per Esploratori dello Spazio, Il Saggiatore (2019), and Un Breve Viaggio Chiamato Terra, Il Saggiatore (2021); together with Edoardo Boncinelli: Il Cosmo della Mente, il Saggiatore (2018) — also published in Spain: El cosmo de la Mente, Tusquets (2020), Gúia Turistica para Exploradores del Espacio, Tusquets (2022), and in Portugal: O Cosmo da Mente, Presença (2019) — L'Infinito Gioco della Scienza, Il Saggiatore (2020), and Tutto si Trasforma, Il Saggiatore (2022). For these activities, he was awarded the 2017 Caccuri Prize for Literature and Science and the 2017 Maria Antonia Gervasio Prize.

On 2 June 2018, Ereditato has been awarded the title of Ufficiale al Merito della Repubblica Italiana.

Scientific achievements

Responsible for the specific trigger for tri-muon search in the NA10 experiment at CERN and the related physics analysis 
Responsible for the installation, operation and calibration of the streamer tube calorimeter of the CHARM II experiment.
Measurement of the Weinberg angle in νμ – electron interactions
Initiative to contribute with an INFN Napoli group to the CERN SPACAL project and to the follow up RD1 experiment. World record energy resolution for hadronic calorimeters
Co-promoter of the CALOR Conference series (1991→today)
Proponent of R&D studies on novel liquid scintillator calorimeters (FORWARD) and trackers (ACTAR)
Proposal of using a lead-fiber calorimeter in the CHORUS experiment. Project Leader for its construction and responsible of its operation. Initiative to set up and operate a CHORUS emulsion scanning laboratory at INFN Napoli
Measurement of neutrino properties and of neutrino induced processes with the CHARM II and CHORUS experiments. Most sensitive limit to νμ−ντ oscillations with a short baseline experiment
Initiative and proposal of new high-sensitivity, short-baseline neutrino oscillation experiments: TENOR and TOSCA
Co-proponent of the conceptual idea of the OPERA experiment. Leader of the initial phase of the experiment, until its scientific approval from CERN
Co-author of the Technical Design Report of the CNGS neutrino beam
Setting up of a cryogenic laboratory at INFN Napoli to develop LAr TPCs within the ICARUS project
As LHEP and AEC Director in Bern, promoter of new initiatives in addition to ATLAS and OPERA: T2K and NA61 experiments, R&D on novel cryogenic detectors, medical physics, novel applications of nuclear emulsions for muon and proton radiography, measurement of the equivalence principle for antimatter and quantum interference, search for sterile neutrinos, future neutrino observatories
First indication of a non-zero θ13 angle in the PMNS neutrino mixing matrix with the T2K experiment
World record drift track length in LAr TPCs with the ARGONTUBE detector
First application of UV laser calibration for LAr TPCs
Co-proponent of the use of nuclear emulsions for the antimatter AEgIS experiment at CERN
Contribution to the setting up of the cyclotron laboratory of the Bern Inselspital for isotope production and research
Discovery of νe appearance with the T2K experiment
Discovery of the Higgs boson with the ATLAS experiment
Contribution to the realization of LAr TPC based experiments at Fermilab (MicroBooNE and SBND)
Discovery of ντ oscillation appearance with the OPERA experiment
Initiative for an R&D project at CERN/Fermilab on a novel LAr TPC for DUNE (ARGONCUBE)
Initiative for a new long baseline neutrino-oscillation project at Fermilab (LBNF/DUNE)
First measurement of muon-antineutrino disappearance with the T2K experiment
First indication for a non vanishing CP violating phase in the PMNS mixing matrix with T2K
First proof of a pixelated readout for LAr TPCs
First evidence for antimatter interference (QPLAS experiment)
Solution of the sterile neutrino problem (MicroBooNE experiment)

References

External links

Experimental physicists
21st-century Italian physicists
Italian science writers
People associated with CERN
1955 births
Academic staff of the University of Bern
Living people